Raphia hookeri is a palm species in the family Arecaceae. It is found in Western and Central Africa, where it is locally used to make palm wine.

References

hookeri